is one of the techniques adopted later by the Kodokan into their Shinmeisho No Waza (newly accepted techniques) list. It is categorized as a side sacrifice technique, Yoko-sutemi.

Technique Description 
This technique involves drawing your opponent forward with your non-dominant hand, while putting your dominant hand completely past their opposite shoulder, turn, and bend forward while blocking with your dominant leg. Carry opponent over as you sacrifice on top on them.

Included Systems 
Judo

External links
Judo Techniques by type.*Judo Lists by rank.
Execution of the technique on YouTube

Judo technique